Krachi West is one of the constituencies represented in the Parliament of Ghana. It elects one Member of Parliament (MP) by the first past the post system of election. Krachi West is located in the Krachi district  of the Oti Region of Ghana.

Boundaries
The seat is located within the Krachi West district of the Volta Region of Ghana. It covers the whole of the new Krachi West District. To the east is the Krachi East constituency in the Krachi East District. It also shares a short border with the Nkwanta South to the north east. Its western neighbour is the Sene constituency in the Sene District of the Brong Ahafo Region. Its northern neighbour is the East Gonja District in the Northern Region.

History 

This boundaries of this constituency were changed prior to the  Ghanaian parliamentary election in 2004 when the Krachi constituency was split into the Krachi West and the Krachi East constituencies respectively due to the creation of the new Krachi East District from the Krachi district.

Members of Parliament

Elections

See also
List of Ghana Parliament constituencies

References 

Adam Carr's Election Archives
Ghana Home Page

Parliamentary constituencies in the Oti Region
2004 establishments in Ghana